K.H. Fathurrahman Kafrawi (1901–1969) was the Minister of Religion in Indonesia from 1946 to 1947. He was with Abdul Kahar Muzakkir also instrumental in establishing the College of Islamic and turned it into Islamic University of Indonesia, UIN Sunan Kalidjaga Yogyakarta, and UIN Syarif Hidayatullah Jakarta.

References 

1901 births
1969 deaths
Government ministers of Indonesia
Place of birth missing